Ashok Nagar is a residential locality situated at the southern part of Chennai, Tamil Nadu, India. It was established in 1964. At the heart of this colony, stands the Ashok Pillar. This four lion head stump, resembles the one erected by king Ashoka during the 3rd century BCE at Sanchi.

To promote this suburban locality, the Tamil Nadu Housing Board constructed flats during the 1970s for middle-income group, covering an area of 7 sq km including the neighbourhood of K. K. Nagar. The next major infrastructure was shopping complex constructed near Pillar in 1974. Banks, Ration shop, Grocery stores, urban development office were started functioning here. Followed by it was inauguration of Anna Community hall and sports club. In the early 1980s, Udhayam Theatre complex and ESI hospital emerged. Later more government schools and additional facilities were added.

Location

Ashok Nagar is located west of Mambalam (T. Nagar), Chennai, Tamil Nadu, India. 
It is surrounded by KK Nagar on the West, Vadapalani on the North, Kodambakkam on the North East and Saidapet on the South.

Business establishments

Ashok Nagar has several finance establishments had set up their operations.

Transportation

There is an intra-city connectivity from Ashok Nagar.  Government city buses and share autos commutes to North, Mid and South Chennai.

There is a Metro station, opposite Udayam. It is the tallest metro station in Chennai and has been planned with 4 floors of shopping area. The area is one of the well-planned localities in Chennai, with broad roads and road-numbering system.

Entertainment

The Udhayam Multiplex cinema with 4 screens is at Pillar junction. Also close by at Vadapalani are the Kamala, AVM Rajeswari, SSR Pangajam theatres Palazzo and Inox. Kasi theatre is at Ekattuthangal, about 5 min walk from Udhayam.

Sangamam, is a 10-day music & dance festival conducted across Chennai during the month of January. Ashok Nagar corporation park is one of the venue that hosts this festival.

Play areas

The corporation park is situated near pillar junction. This park has track for walking and a small play area for kids. It is well maintained with cleanliness and toilet facilities. Visitors should park their vehicles outside. Park timings are morning between 5 am and 9 am, evening between 4 pm and 9 pm. Chennai corporation's elected council gave the green signal to Metro Rail for taking over the 4,246 square metres of Corporation park in Ashok Nagar.

Kids play park at 12th Avenue is a compact play area for kids below 10. Park timings are morning between 5am and 9am, evening between 4 pm and 9 pm. This park is also called as 5E park.

The Manthope Colony Cricket ground located near Manthope Colony has many unofficial sports clubs. A Tennikoit and Badminton courts are there. Elders and Youths team up for match early mornings and weekends. Football is played in the evenings by many groups. This ground has flood lights which are lit up during evenings daily. Football is primarily played after 5 pm

Pudhur High School Ground is another spot where many cricket pitches are made on weekends.

Educational institutions
 Sri Chaitanya Techno curriculum
 Govt. Girls Hr. Sec. School
 Velankanni Matriculation Higher Secondary School
 Police Training College
 Jawahar Vidyalaya
 Dr.K.K.Nirmala Girls Higher Secondary School
 Vidya Niketan
 Kendriya Vidyalaya Ashok Nagar
 Pudur High School
 Brindavan Institute for Commerce
 GRT Matriculation School
 St. John's Matriculation School
 Little Flower Matriculation Higher Secondary School
 Jawahar Higher Secondary School
 JRK Matriculation Higher Sec School
 Vidhayaniketan Matriculation Higher Secondary School

Newspapers
Pillar Times
Arcot Road Talk
Pillar Talk
Mambalam times

See also

Ashok Nagar (disambiguation)

References 

Neighbourhoods in Chennai
Cities and towns in Chennai district
Suburbs of Chennai